Trafalgar is a town in the West Gippsland region of Victoria, Australia. The town backs onto the foothills of the Strzelecki Ranges to the south. The township sits at approximately 70 metres above sea level.
The town is named in honour of the Battle of Trafalgar, 1805, which established the Royal Navy's supremacy at sea; allowing consolidation of Britain's Australian colonies at the time.

Trafalgar Post Office opened on 2 June 1879.

Trafalgar was noted for having a cheese factory producing award-winning cheeses. The factory was owned by Petersville from 1960 until its closure in 1990.

The town has a railway station on the Bairnsdale railway line. It also has a swimming pool, tennis courts, Scouts hall, Uniting church and town hall.

Education
Trafalgar is serviced by a number of schools:
 Trafalgar Primary School
 St Josephs School (Primary)
 Trafalgar High School

Sport
Trafalgar has an Australian Rules football team, The Bloods, which competes in the Mid Gippsland Football League. In their distinctive colours of blood red with white stripes, The Bloods have had great success since joining the league in 1969, winning over 100 premierships, their latest being in 2017 when they defeated Newborough by 69 points.

Golfers play at the course of the Trafalgar Golf Club on Gibsons Road - a beautifully crafted course in a rural setting, often listed by golfing magazines as one of the best in Australia.

Trafalgar has a lawn bowling club, the Trafalgar Bowls Club with a synthetic green and a grass green, situated in Seven Mile Road. The Club officially opened in September, 1915.

Warragul Radio stations Triple M Gippsland and 3GG also service this region.

Notable people
 Judy Hall, local musician and piano teacher in Gippsland for over 70 years.
Tim Forsyth, Olympic highjumper, attended Trafalgar High School
 Harold Mitchell, Melbourne based media tycoon and philanthropist.
 Bill Collins, race-caller.
 Jackson Noonan, notable local cricket player with history playing throughout the Gippsland and English leagues.

See also

 Thorpdale, Victoria
 Moe, Victoria
 Trafalgar railway station

References

External links
A tourism page (Sydney Morning Herald)
Trafalgar Official Trafalgar Website.

Towns in Victoria (Australia)
Shire of Baw Baw